Furan (also written as: Furens) is a 39.3 km long river in central France (Loire department), right tributary of the river Loire. It flows through the city Saint-Étienne and flows into the Loire in the small town Andrézieux-Bouthéon.

Towns along the river include:
 Le Bessat
 Tarentaise
 Saint-Étienne
 La Fouillouse
 Andrézieux-Bouthéon

References

Rivers of France
Rivers of Auvergne-Rhône-Alpes
Rivers of Loire (department)